Chuarrancho is a municipality in the Guatemala department of Guatemala. The mayor is Roberto Tocay (UNE).

Municipalities of the Guatemala Department